The 2019 NRL season was the 112th  of professional rugby league in Australia and the 22nd season run by the National Rugby League.

Regular season 
All times are in AEST (UTC+10:00) on the relevant dates.

Round 1

 The Parramatta Eels won an away game for the first time since Round 25, 2017, ending a 13 game losing streak.
 The Gold Coast Titans became the first team since the North Queensland Cowboys in 2012 to be held scoreless in Round 1.

Round 2

 For the first time in their 20 year history as a merger, the Wests Tigers sit on top the competition ladder.

Round 3

 The North Queensland Cowboys suffered their biggest loss since the 2017 NRL Grand Final, and their biggest at home since round 8, 2010.

Round 4

 The Brisbane Broncos suffered their worst loss since round 17, 2016.
 The Gold Coast Titans had a 0-4 start to a year for the first time in their history.

Round 5

 The Rabbitohs/Warriors game was the first NRL game on the Sunshine Coast.
 The Bulldogs 40-4 loss to the Dragons was their worst to any St George team since round 18, 1965.

Round 6

 The Broncos 1-5 start to the year is their worst start to a season since 1999.
 The game between the Eels and Tigers was the first played at Bankwest Stadium, and it was the Eels biggest win since round 25, 2007.

Round 7 (ANZAC Round)

Round 8

 The Raiders/Panthers game was the first game played in Wagga Wagga since 1998.

Round 9 (Magic Round)

 For the first time in NRL History, all games were played on the same ground for Magic Round.
 The Knights beat the Bulldogs for the first time since the Elimination Finals in 2013.

Round 10

 The Penrith Panthers 2-8 start to the season is their worst start to a season since 2002.
 The Gold Coast Titans suffered the worst collapse in their history, after leading 16-0.
 The Newcastle Knights had their biggest win since round 10, 2013.

Round 11 (Indigenous Round)

Round 12

 The North Queensland Cowboys score of 6 is their lowest ever in a win.

Round 13

 For the first time in their history, the Canberra Raiders have kept 3 teams scoreless in the same season.
 The South Sydney Rabbitohs-Newcastle Knights game featured 4 sin bins all at the same time.
 The Knights beat the Rabbitohs for the first time since Round 26, 2011.

Round 14

 The Penrith Panthers beat the South Sydney Rabbitohs at ANZ Stadium for the first time in their history.

Round 15

 The crowd for the Eels/Raiders game was the lowest of the season so far.

Round 16

 For the first time in NRL History, a team (Cronulla Sharks) lost 3 straight after scoring more tries than their opponent in all of those games.

Round 17

 The Broncos Warriors game marked the first NRL draw since Round 21, 2016.
 Cameron Smith played his 400th NRL game in Melbourne's win over Cronulla.
 Canberra Raiders centre Nick Cotric became the first player of the 2019 season to be sent off for a spear tackle on his Dragons opposite Tim Lafai.

Round 18

 Thursday’s game was the first ever match in Australian professional rugby league history to be refereed by a female, with Belinda Sharpe partnering Ben Cummins as the whistleblowers.
 The Penrith Panthers had their biggest win over the Dragons since 2000.

Round 19

Round 20

 The Titans 58-6 loss was their second biggest loss ever (just 2 points behind the 54-0 loss against Brisbane in Round 22, 2017), their biggest away loss, and the most points they have ever conceded in their history.
 The Roosters won by more than 50 for the first time since defeating the Eels 56-4 in Round 2, 2014.

Round 21 (Retro Round)

 The Roosters won their first game in Canberra since Round 17, 2010.

Round 22 (Women In League Round)

 Melbourne surrendered an 18-0 lead after 29 minutes.
 The Raiders won their first game in Melbourne since Round 8, 2013.

Round 23

Round 24

 The Willows Sports Complex also known as 1300SMILES Stadium hosted its last ever NRL game.
 Paul Gallen played his final regular season home match at Shark Park.
 The Sharks vs. Raiders match was the first match to feature five or more field goals since the 1970 grand final.

Round 25

South Sydney beat the Roosters twice within the home and away season for the first time since 2009.
For the 8th straight time the Tigers missed out on the finals.

References 

2019 NRL season